The 2005–06 San Jose Sharks season was the Sharks' 15th season in the National Hockey League (NHL).

Off-season

Regular season
On November 30, 2005, the Boston Bruins traded Joe Thornton - who was the team's leading scorer at the time by a substantial margin - to the San Jose Sharks in a four-player deal which sent Marco Sturm, Wayne Primeau and Brad Stuart to Boston.

Final standings

Playoffs
In the first round of the 2006 NHL Western Conference playoffs, the fifth-seeded Sharks defeated the fourth-seeded Nashville Predators in five games. The two teams split the first two games in Nashville's Gaylord Entertainment Center, but when the series shifted to San Jose's HP Pavilion, the Sharks took both games and a stranglehold on the series. The Sharks then finished off the Predators when the series moved back to Nashville, taking Game 5, 2–1.

The Sharks then moved on to the second round, facing the eighth-seeded Edmonton Oilers, who had upset the heavily favored, top-seeded Detroit Red Wings. The Sharks took the first two games in San Jose by identical 2–1 scores, but when the series shifted to Rexall Place in Edmonton, the Oilers never lost again in the series, taking two in Edmonton, one in San Jose and another back in Edmonton to complete the 4–2 series victory, setting up a Western Conference Final match-up against the Mighty Ducks of Anaheim.

Schedule and results

Regular season

|- align="center" bgcolor="#FFBBBB"
|1||L||October 5, 2005||2–3 || align="left"| @ Nashville Predators (2005–06) ||0–1–0 || 
|- align="center" bgcolor="#FFBBBB"
|2||L||October 7, 2005||3–6 || align="left"| @ Chicago Blackhawks (2005–06) ||0–2–0 || 
|- align="center" bgcolor="#CCFFCC" 
|3||W||October 8, 2005||7–6 || align="left"| @ St. Louis Blues (2005–06) ||1–2–0 || 
|- align="center" bgcolor="#CCFFCC" 
|4||W||October 12, 2005||4–1 || align="left"|  Columbus Blue Jackets (2005–06) ||2–2–0 || 
|- align="center" bgcolor="#CCFFCC" 
|5||W||October 15, 2005||4–3 || align="left"|  Chicago Blackhawks (2005–06) ||3–2–0 || 
|- align="center" 
|6||L||October 17, 2005||2–3 OT|| align="left"| @ Detroit Red Wings (2005–06) ||3–2–1 || 
|- align="center" bgcolor="#FFBBBB"
|7||L||October 19, 2005||1–6 || align="left"| @ Minnesota Wild (2005–06) ||3–3–1 || 
|- align="center" bgcolor="#FFBBBB"
|8||L||October 21, 2005||1–4 || align="left"| @ Columbus Blue Jackets (2005–06) ||3–4–1 || 
|- align="center" bgcolor="#FFBBBB"
|9||L||October 22, 2005||1–2 || align="left"| @ Nashville Predators (2005–06) ||3–5–1 || 
|- align="center" bgcolor="#CCFFCC" 
|10||W||October 26, 2005||5–4 OT|| align="left"| @ Dallas Stars (2005–06) ||4–5–1 || 
|- align="center" bgcolor="#CCFFCC" 
|11||W||October 28, 2005||5–4 || align="left"| @ Los Angeles Kings (2005–06) ||5–5–1 || 
|- align="center" bgcolor="#CCFFCC" 
|12||W||October 29, 2005||3–2 SO|| align="left"|  Calgary Flames (2005–06) ||6–5–1 || 
|-

|- align="center" bgcolor="#CCFFCC" 
|13||W||November 2, 2005||3–2 OT|| align="left"|  Nashville Predators (2005–06) ||7–5–1 || 
|- align="center" bgcolor="#CCFFCC" 
|14||W||November 4, 2005||1–0 OT|| align="left"| @ Mighty Ducks of Anaheim (2005–06) ||8–5–1 || 
|- align="center" bgcolor="#FFBBBB"
|15||L||November 5, 2005||1–3 || align="left"|  Minnesota Wild (2005–06) ||8–6–1 || 
|- align="center" bgcolor="#FFBBBB"
|16||L||November 8, 2005||2–5 || align="left"| @ Colorado Avalanche (2005–06) ||8–7–1 || 
|- align="center" 
|17||L||November 12, 2005||2–3 SO|| align="left"|  Dallas Stars (2005–06) ||8–7–2 || 
|- align="center" bgcolor="#FFBBBB"
|18||L||November 16, 2005||1–3 || align="left"|  Vancouver Canucks (2005–06) ||8–8–2 || 
|- align="center" 
|19||L||November 19, 2005||3–4 SO|| align="left"|  Phoenix Coyotes (2005–06) ||8–8–3 || 
|- align="center" 
|20||L||November 21, 2005||1–2 SO|| align="left"| @ Edmonton Oilers (2005–06) ||8–8–4 || 
|- align="center" bgcolor="#FFBBBB"
|21||L||November 23, 2005||2–3 || align="left"| @ Calgary Flames (2005–06) ||8–9–4 || 
|- align="center" bgcolor="#FFBBBB"
|22||L||November 24, 2005||2–3 || align="left"| @ Vancouver Canucks (2005–06) ||8–10–4 || 
|- align="center" bgcolor="#FFBBBB"
|23||L||November 26, 2005||6–7 || align="left"|  Detroit Red Wings (2005–06) ||8–11–4 || 
|- align="center" bgcolor="#FFBBBB"
|24||L||November 30, 2005||1–4 || align="left"| @ Dallas Stars (2005–06) ||8–12–4 || 
|-

|- align="center" bgcolor="#CCFFCC" 
|25||W||December 2, 2005||5–0 || align="left"| @ Buffalo Sabres (2005–06) ||9–12–4 || 
|- align="center" bgcolor="#CCFFCC" 
|26||W||December 3, 2005||5–4 || align="left"| @ Toronto Maple Leafs (2005–06) ||10–12–4 || 
|- align="center" bgcolor="#CCFFCC" 
|27||W||December 6, 2005||5–3 || align="left"|  Atlanta Thrashers (2005–06) ||11–12–4 || 
|- align="center" bgcolor="#CCFFCC" 
|28||W||December 8, 2005||6–2 || align="left"|  Florida Panthers (2005–06) ||12–12–4 || 
|- align="center" bgcolor="#CCFFCC" 
|29||W||December 10, 2005||4–3 || align="left"|  Carolina Hurricanes (2005–06) ||13–12–4 || 
|- align="center" bgcolor="#CCFFCC" 
|30||W||December 16, 2005||4–1 || align="left"|  Washington Capitals (2005–06) ||14–12–4 || 
|- align="center" bgcolor="#FFBBBB"
|31||L||December 18, 2005||4–5 || align="left"| @ Mighty Ducks of Anaheim (2005–06) ||14–13–4 || 
|- align="center" bgcolor="#CCFFCC" 
|32||W||December 20, 2005||4–2 || align="left"|  Mighty Ducks of Anaheim (2005–06) ||15–13–4 || 
|- align="center" bgcolor="#FFBBBB"
|33||L||December 22, 2005||1–2 || align="left"| @ Phoenix Coyotes (2005–06) ||15–14–4 || 
|- align="center" 
|34||L||December 23, 2005||1–2 SO|| align="left"|  St. Louis Blues (2005–06) ||15–14–5 || 
|- align="center" bgcolor="#FFBBBB"
|35||L||December 26, 2005||3–4 || align="left"| @ Los Angeles Kings (2005–06) ||15–15–5 || 
|- align="center" bgcolor="#FFBBBB"
|36||L||December 28, 2005||4–5 || align="left"|  Phoenix Coyotes (2005–06) ||15–16–5 || 
|- align="center" bgcolor="#CCFFCC" 
|37||W||December 30, 2005||5–2 || align="left"|  Colorado Avalanche (2005–06) ||16–16–5 || 
|-

|- align="center" bgcolor="#CCFFCC" 
|38||W||January 5, 2006||6–3 || align="left"|  Columbus Blue Jackets (2005–06) ||17–16–5 || 
|- align="center" bgcolor="#CCFFCC" 
|39||W||January 7, 2006||3–2 || align="left"|  Los Angeles Kings (2005–06) ||18–16–5 || 
|- align="center" bgcolor="#CCFFCC" 
|40||W||January 10, 2006||6–2 || align="left"| @ Boston Bruins (2005–06) ||19–16–5 || 
|- align="center" bgcolor="#CCFFCC" 
|41||W||January 12, 2006||2–0 || align="left"| @ Ottawa Senators (2005–06) ||20–16–5 || 
|- align="center" bgcolor="#FFBBBB"
|42||L||January 14, 2006||2–6 || align="left"| @ Montreal Canadiens (2005–06) ||20–17–5 || 
|- align="center" bgcolor="#CCFFCC" 
|43||W||January 16, 2006||3–1 || align="left"|  Tampa Bay Lightning (2005–06) ||21–17–5 || 
|- align="center" 
|44||L||January 19, 2006||2–3 SO|| align="left"|  Edmonton Oilers (2005–06) ||21–17–6 || 
|- align="center" bgcolor="#CCFFCC" 
|45||W||January 21, 2006||4–3 OT|| align="left"| @ Los Angeles Kings (2005–06) ||22–17–6 || 
|- align="center" bgcolor="#CCFFCC" 
|46||W||January 24, 2006||4–1 || align="left"|  Los Angeles Kings (2005–06) ||23–17–6 || 
|- align="center" bgcolor="#FFBBBB"
|47||L||January 26, 2006||0–2 || align="left"|  Mighty Ducks of Anaheim (2005–06) ||23–18–6 || 
|- align="center" bgcolor="#FFBBBB"
|48||L||January 28, 2006||2–6 || align="left"| @ Phoenix Coyotes (2005–06) ||23–19–6 || 
|- align="center" 
|49||L||January 30, 2006||2–3 OT|| align="left"| @ Dallas Stars (2005–06) ||23–19–7 || 
|-

|- align="center" bgcolor="#CCFFCC" 
|50||W||February 1, 2006||6–4 || align="left"| @ Mighty Ducks of Anaheim (2005–06) ||24–19–7 || 
|- align="center" 
|51||L||February 2, 2006||2–3 SO|| align="left"|  Minnesota Wild (2005–06) ||24–19–8 || 
|- align="center" bgcolor="#FFBBBB"
|52||L||February 4, 2006||0–2 || align="left"|  Mighty Ducks of Anaheim (2005–06) ||24–20–8 || 
|- align="center" bgcolor="#FFBBBB"
|53||L||February 6, 2006||3–4 || align="left"|  Calgary Flames (2005–06) ||24–21–8 || 
|- align="center" bgcolor="#CCFFCC" 
|54||W||February 8, 2006||2–1 || align="left"|  Chicago Blackhawks (2005–06) ||25–21–8 || 
|- align="center" bgcolor="#CCFFCC" 
|55||W||February 10, 2006||6–3 || align="left"|  Dallas Stars (2005–06) ||26–21–8 || 
|- align="center" bgcolor="#CCFFCC" 
|56||W||February 12, 2006||5–4 OT|| align="left"| @ Phoenix Coyotes (2005–06) ||27–21–8 || 
|- align="center" bgcolor="#CCFFCC" 
|57||W||February 28, 2006||5–1 || align="left"|  Detroit Red Wings (2005–06) ||28–21–8 || 
|-

|- align="center" bgcolor="#FFBBBB"
|58||L||March 3, 2006||2–3 || align="left"| @ Edmonton Oilers (2005–06) ||28–22–8 || 
|- align="center" bgcolor="#FFBBBB"
|59||L||March 4, 2006||0–2 || align="left"| @ Calgary Flames (2005–06) ||28–23–8 || 
|- align="center" 
|60||L||March 7, 2006||4–5 OT|| align="left"| @ Mighty Ducks of Anaheim (2005–06) ||28–23–9 || 
|- align="center" bgcolor="#CCFFCC" 
|61||W||March 9, 2006||5–2 || align="left"|  Edmonton Oilers (2005–06) ||29–23–9 || 
|- align="center" bgcolor="#CCFFCC" 
|62||W||March 11, 2006||3–2 OT|| align="left"|  Nashville Predators (2005–06) ||30–23–9 || 
|- align="center" bgcolor="#CCFFCC" 
|63||W||March 13, 2006||4–3 || align="left"|  Los Angeles Kings (2005–06) ||31–23–9 || 
|- align="center" bgcolor="#CCFFCC" 
|64||W||March 16, 2006||5–2 || align="left"|  St. Louis Blues (2005–06) ||32–23–9 || 
|- align="center" 
|65||L||March 18, 2006||3–4 SO|| align="left"|  Dallas Stars (2005–06) ||32–23–10 || 
|- align="center" bgcolor="#CCFFCC" 
|66||W||March 19, 2006||6–5 || align="left"|  Colorado Avalanche (2005–06) ||33–23–10 || 
|- align="center" bgcolor="#CCFFCC" 
|67||W||March 21, 2006||6–0 || align="left"| @ St. Louis Blues (2005–06) ||34–23–10 || 
|- align="center" bgcolor="#FFBBBB"
|68||L||March 23, 2006||0–4 || align="left"| @ Detroit Red Wings (2005–06) ||34–24–10 || 
|- align="center" bgcolor="#CCFFCC" 
|69||W||March 25, 2006||5–1 || align="left"| @ Minnesota Wild (2005–06) ||35–24–10 || 
|- align="center" bgcolor="#CCFFCC" 
|70||W||March 26, 2006||5–4 OT|| align="left"| @ Chicago Blackhawks (2005–06) ||36–24–10 || 
|- align="center" bgcolor="#FFBBBB"
|71||L||March 28, 2006||1–4 || align="left"| @ Columbus Blue Jackets (2005–06) ||36–25–10 || 
|- align="center" bgcolor="#FFBBBB"
|72||L||March 30, 2006||2–5 || align="left"|  Phoenix Coyotes (2005–06) ||36–26–10 || 
|-

|- align="center" 
|73||L||April 1, 2006||3–4 OT|| align="left"|  Phoenix Coyotes (2005–06) ||36–26–11 || 
|- align="center" bgcolor="#CCFFCC" 
|74||W||April 3, 2006||3–2 OT|| align="left"| @ Dallas Stars (2005–06) ||37–26–11 || 
|- align="center" bgcolor="#CCFFCC" 
|75||W||April 5, 2006||2–1 || align="left"| @ Colorado Avalanche (2005–06) ||38–26–11 || 
|- align="center" bgcolor="#CCFFCC" 
|76||W||April 6, 2006||5–0 || align="left"| @ Los Angeles Kings (2005–06) ||39–26–11 || 
|- align="center" bgcolor="#CCFFCC" 
|77||W||April 9, 2006||4–1 || align="left"|  Dallas Stars (2005–06) ||40–26–11 || 
|- align="center" bgcolor="#CCFFCC" 
|78||W||April 10, 2006||3–2 || align="left"| @ Phoenix Coyotes (2005–06) ||41–26–11 || 
|- align="center" bgcolor="#CCFFCC" 
|79||W||April 12, 2006||5–4 OT|| align="left"| @ Vancouver Canucks (2005–06) ||42–26–11 || 
|- align="center" bgcolor="#CCFFCC" 
|80||W||April 13, 2006||5–3 || align="left"|  Vancouver Canucks (2005–06) ||43–26–11 || 
|- align="center" bgcolor="#CCFFCC" 
|81||W||April 15, 2006||6–3 || align="left"|  Mighty Ducks of Anaheim (2005–06) ||44–26–11 || 
|- align="center" bgcolor="#FFBBBB"
|82||L||April 17, 2006||0–4 || align="left"|  Los Angeles Kings (2005–06) ||44–27–11 || 
|-

|-
| Legend:

Playoffs

|- align="center" bgcolor="#FFBBBB"
| 1 ||L|| April 21, 2006 || 3–4 || align="left"| @ Nashville Predators || Predators lead 1–0 || 
|- align="center" bgcolor="#CCFFCC"
| 2 ||W|| April 23, 2006 || 3–0 || align="left"| @ Nashville Predators || Series tied 1–1 || 
|- align="center" bgcolor="#CCFFCC"
| 3 ||W|| April 25, 2006 || 4–1 || align="left"| Nashville Predators || Sharks lead 2–1 || 
|- align="center" bgcolor="#CCFFCC"
| 4 ||W|| April 27, 2006 || 5–4 || align="left"| Nashville Predators || Sharks lead 3–1 || 
|- align="center" bgcolor="#CCFFCC"
| 5 ||W|| April 30, 2006 || 2–1 || align="left"| @ Nashville Predators || Sharks win 4–1 || 
|-

|- align="center" bgcolor="#CCFFCC"
| 1 ||W|| May 7, 2006 || 2–1 || align="left"| Edmonton Oilers || Sharks lead 1–0 || 
|- align="center" bgcolor="#CCFFCC"
| 2 ||W|| May 8, 2006 || 2–1 || align="left"| Edmonton Oilers || Sharks lead 2–0 || 
|- align="center" bgcolor="#FFBBBB"
| 3 ||L|| May 10, 2006 || 2–3 3OT || align="left"| @ Edmonton Oilers || Sharks lead 2–1 || 
|- align="center" bgcolor="#FFBBBB"
| 4 ||L|| May 12, 2006 || 3–6 || align="left"| @ Edmonton Oilers || Series tied 2–2 || 
|- align="center" bgcolor="#FFBBBB"
| 5 ||L|| May 14, 2006 || 3–6 || align="left"| Edmonton Oilers || Oilers lead 3–2 || 
|- align="center" bgcolor="#FFBBBB"
| 6 ||L|| May 17, 2006 || 0–2 || align="left"| @ Edmonton Oilers || Oilers win 4–2 || 
|-

|-
| Legend:

Player statistics

Scoring
 Position abbreviations: C = Center; D = Defense; G = Goaltender; LW = Left Wing; RW = Right Wing
  = Joined team via a transaction (e.g., trade, waivers, signing) during the season. Stats reflect time with the Sharks only.
  = Left team via a transaction (e.g., trade, waivers, release) during the season. Stats reflect time with the Sharks only.

Goaltending

Awards and records

Awards

Transactions
The Sharks were involved in the following transactions from February 17, 2005, the day after the 2004–05 NHL season was officially cancelled, through June 19, 2006, the day of the deciding game of the 2006 Stanley Cup Finals.

Trades

Players acquired

Players lost

Signings

Draft picks
San Jose's draft picks at the 2005 NHL Entry Draft held at the Westin Hotel in Ottawa, Ontario.

See also
2005–06 NHL season

Notes

References

San
San
San Jose Sharks seasons
San Jose Sharks
San Jose Sharks